Warsaw Gasworks Museum (pol. Muzeum Gazownictwa w Warszawie) is a museum in Warsaw, Poland, located in the complex of the former Wola Gas Factory built in 1886–1888.

The museum opened in 1977.  It contains various machines which were involved in the production and metering of gas as well as gas lamps from the 19th and 20th centuries.  The museum also holds a collection of historic documents related to the history of the Warsaw Gas Company.

References

External links
Gas Museum website

See also

 List of petroleum museums

Industry museums in Poland
Museums in Warsaw
Gas museums
Natural gas in Poland
Industrial buildings completed in 1888
1888 establishments in Poland